The geography of Pluto entails the delineation and characterization of regions on Pluto. Plutonian geography is mainly focused on what is called physical geography on Earth; that is, the distribution of physical features across Pluto and their cartographic representations. On 14 July 2015, the New Horizons spacecraft became the first spacecraft to fly by Pluto. During its brief flyby, New Horizons made detailed geographical measurements and observations of Pluto and its moons.

Coordinate system orientation

Pluto may be defined as having retrograde rotation and an axial tilt of 60 degrees, or prograde rotation and a tilt of 120 degrees. Following the latter convention (the right-hand rule), the hemisphere currently in daylight is the northern one, with much of the southern hemisphere in darkness. This is the convention used by the International Astronomical Union (IAU) and the New Horizons team, and their maps put the sunlit hemisphere on top. However, older sources may define Pluto's rotation as retrograde and therefore the sunlit side as the southern hemisphere. East and west are also swapped between the two conventions.

The prime meridian of Pluto is defined as the longitude facing Charon.

Topographical features

The following names were originally proposed by the New Horizons discovery team. These names were variously taken from historical figures involved in the study of Pluto, notable space exploration missions, and a variety of chthonic deities or demons, some from ancient mythology and others from modern popular culture. While several of these names have been canonized by the IAU as of 2017, most remain informal classifications that have yet to be considered.

Tombaugh Regio

Tombaugh Regio (nicknamed "The Heart") is a large, light-colored topographical region, formed in the shape of a heart, named after the modern discoverer of Pluto, Clyde Tombaugh. The two top lobes of the heart are distinct geological features, both having a bright and whiteish appearance, with the western lobe (called Sputnik Planitia--a vast plain of nitrogen and other ices) being smoother than the eastern lobe. The region contains two 
peaks composed of water-ice along its southwestern edge, Hillary Montes and Tenzing Montes. The lack of craters in the region suggests that this its surface is less than 100 million years old, hence the speculation that Pluto is probably geologically active. Subsequent data indicated that features near the western edges of the region (an area about the size of Texas) show evidence of "exotic ice flow", similar to melting glaciers, rich in methane, carbon monoxide and nitrogen ices. Potentially recent glacial activity, near  Cthulhu Macula, is suggested by the presence of lighter-hued material overlaid on top of darker, more ancient portions; according to Lillian Gipson at NASA, "...In the southernmost region of the heart, adjacent to the dark equatorial region, it appears that ancient, heavily-cratered terrain (informally named “Cthulhu Regio”) has been invaded by much newer icy deposits."

The Brass Knuckles

A series of semi-regularly spaced dark spots with irregular boundaries are nicknamed the Brass Knuckles. The brass knuckles are separated from one another by tall uplands. There are also many canyons running through them and through the surrounding mountains that are hundreds of miles long and several miles deep. From west (south of Tombaugh Regio) to east (west of the Whale's tail), the Knuckles are:

 Krun Macula, after a lord of the underworld in the Mandaean religion of southern Iraq
 Ala Macula, after an underworld and harvest deity of the Igbo people of eastern Nigeria
 Balrog Macula, after a fictional race of demons in J. R. R. Tolkien's fantasy mythos
 Vucub-Came Macula and Hun-Came Macula, after the two leading death gods in the Popol Vuh text of the K'iche' Maya
 Meng-p'o Macula, after a goddess from Chinese Buddhism who caused the dead to forget their past lives

Cthulhu Macula

Cthulhu Macula (formerly called Cthulhu Regio), nicknamed The Whale after its shape, is an elongated, dark region along Pluto's equator named after the fictional deity from the works of H. P. Lovecraft. It is the largest of the dark regions (Brass Knuckles) that span Pluto's equator. The dark color of the area is speculated to be the result of a "tar" made of complex hydrocarbons called tholins covering the surface, formed from methane and nitrogen in the 
atmosphere interacting with ultraviolet light and cosmic rays.
The presence of a large number of craters within Cthulhu indicates that it is perhaps billions of years old, in contrast to the adjacent bright, craterless Sputnik Planitia, which may be as little as 100 million years old.

The Donut

It does not appear as a ring in higher-resolution images.

Dune fields

In the Western part of Sputnik Planitia near Al-Idrisi Montes there are fields of transverse dunes formed by the winds, which blow from the center of Sputnik Planitia in the direction of surrounding mountings. The dune wavelengths are in the range of 0.4–1 km and they likely consist of methane ice particles 200–300 μm in size. The particles are lofted above the surface when the nitrogen ice sublimates under solar irradiation. After that they are moved by gentle winds blowing with 1–10 m/s speeds despite generally low atmospheric pressure of about 15 μbar.

Nomenclature

The Working Group for Planetary System Nomenclature of the International Astronomical Union (IAU) is responsible for assigning official names to surface features on Pluto. On 7 September 2017, the first 14 names were officially approved by the IAU.

As of August 2015, the New Horizons science team derives informal names from the following themes: explorers, space missions, spacecraft, scientists and engineers; fictional explorers, travellers, vessels, destinations and origins; authors and artists who have envisioned exploration; and fictional underworlds, underworld beings, and travellers to the underworld. The New Horizons science team invited members of the public to propose names and vote on them before the spacecraft's arrival.

Gallery

Videos

See also

 Geology of Pluto
 List of geological features on Pluto

References

External links
 NASA Pluto factsheet
 NASA Official homepage
 New Horizons homepage
 Pluto viewed through the years (NASA; GIF animation; 15 July 2015).
 Map of Pluto

 
Pluto
Articles containing video clips